Calvin Simms may refer to:

Calvin Simms, a character in the 2006 film Little Man
Calvin Simms, a character in the novel Chart Throb